The Society of the Faith of Jesus was a short-lived religious congregation of the Catholic Church whose members were known as Fathers of the Faith or Paccanarists, after the congregation's founder, Niccolò Paccanari. The congregation was founded in Rome in 1797 in an attempt to keep alive the Society of Jesus after its suppression by the pope. Its first ten members professed their first vows at the Oratory of San Francesco Saverio del Caravita on August 15, 1797.

On April 12, 1798, Paccanari appeared before Pope Pius VI to obtain his approval for the congregation, which the pope gave. However, the pope instructed Paccanari that the Society of the Faith of Jesus merge with the other incipient, Jesuit offshoot, the Society of Sacred Heart of Jesus. Paccanari agreed to this and the two congregations merged on April 18, 1799, with Paccanari being elected as the new group's superior. Its members established ministries in Italy, France, and Germany, Austria, Switzerland, Holland, and England. The congregation disbanded after Pope Pius VII lifted the order suppressing the Jesuits in 1814, restoring the Society of Jesus.

Notable members 

 Anthony Kohlmann, later became a Jesuit educator
 Niccolò Paccanari, founder

References

Citations

Sources 

 
 

Ignatian spirituality
1797 establishments in Italy
Clerics regular